The Democratic and Republican Union (URD) was the parliamentary group of the conservative Republican Federation in the Chamber of Deputies of France during the French Third Republic (1870–1940).

See also 
Liberalism and radicalism in France
Republican Federation
Sinistrisme

Defunct political parties in France
Political parties of the French Third Republic
Parliamentary groups in France
Opportunist Republicans